Óscar Nicanor Duarte Frutos (born 11 October 1956) is a Paraguayan politician who served as President of Paraguay from 2003 to 2008. In 2013, President Horacio Cartes appointed Duarte as Ambassador to Argentina, a diplomatic posting he held from 2013 until 2016. Duarte currently holds the title of Senator for life.

Duarte, who attended the Mennonite church, was Paraguay's first non-Catholic president.

Career 
Born in Coronel Oviedo, Caaguazú, Nicanor Duarte grew up during the Stroessner administration and was affiliated with Stroessner's Colorado Party at the age of 14 while attending high school in Coronel Oviedo. Dr. Duarte is married to María Gloria Penayo Solaeche and they have six children.

In 1974 Duarte received a bachelor's degree in Sciences and Letters. In 1984 he obtained a law degree from the Catholic University of Asuncion and in 1989 a doctorate from the National University of Asuncion. Later he joined the ruling Colorado party. The preliminary candidate for the Colorados in December 1992 was the former minister of Integration Juan Carlos Wasmosy Monti who in August 1993 became the president of Paraguay. Wasmosy appointed Duarte as his Minister of Education and Culture.  In 1996, a political controversy led Duarte to leave the ruling party.  In February 1997 he resigned as a minister and joined the Reconciliacion Colorada Movement (MRC).

Presidency
In January 2001 he joined the ruling Colorado Party (ANR-PC) again and stood for its presidency for the period 2001–2004.  He obtained the presidential nomination from his party on 22 December 2002. He was proclaimed president with 37.1% of the votes, ahead of Julio César Franco with 24%, Pedro Fadul with 21.3% and Guillermo Sánchez with 13.5% of the votes.  He took office on August 15 for the presidential term 2003–2008, becoming the eleventh consecutive ANR-PC president.

Nicanor Duarte pursued policies which were somewhat more left-wing than has been the case for the Colorado Party over its 60-year rule of Paraguay. At least in speeches, he had opposed free trade and reached out to regional Latin American countries with left-leaning governments.

Resignation as president
Nicanor Duarte announced his resignation as president, in order to assume a position as Senator on 1 July 2008. He presented his resignation on 23 June 2008 to the President of the Congress of Paraguay, Senator Miguel Abdón Saguier.

Opposition and government-endorsed members of the Paraguayan Congress immediately announced they were going to boycott Duarte's resignation by not attending the extraordinary session of the Congress, a session called in order to debate and determine whether the President's resignation is accepted or not. If Congress did not accept the resignation, Duarte would have to continue his term until 15 August and would be unable to become an elected senator, becoming instead a non-voting senator for life as a former president. As expected, the quorum was not reached at the extraordinary session called for this reason for 24 June 2008.

Senate
Since Duarte Frutos could not occupy the seat belonging to him on 1 July, Jorge Cespedes, from the Colorado Party, was assigned and assumed as titular of the vacant seat of Duarte at the Senate. While some held positions in favour of Duarte assuming as senator, due to the sentence from the Superior Electoral Justice Tribunal, other MP's argued that Duarte's assumption as senator would be illegal, and Congress president would be violating Constitution if swearing-in Duarte Frutos without the legal quorum.

On 26 August, an extraordinary session of Congress was called, but as expected, many MP's left the session called for that day, which was declared "empty" or abandoned by Paraguayan Congress President Enrique Gonzalez Quintana (UNACE). Nonetheless, Gonzalez Quintana proceeded to the swearing-in oath required by law, and former President Duarte Frutos, who arrived at the Legislative Palace followed by Colorado Party fellow supporters, was sworn in as senator.

However, on 4 September, the Paraguayan Senate, in session to discuss resolutions on the crisis concerning Duarte Frutos tenure as senator, approved finally a bill, but with some modifications, revalidating a previous bill that had not been approved the previous session of 28 August. On the session of the 28th, Jorge Cespedes was confirmed as titular senator, instead of Duarte Frutos, who was in turn confirmed as senador vitalicio, or senator for life, handing its seat upon Cespedes.

In 2018, Nicanor Duarte and current Paraguayan President Horacio Cartes were elected as senators to represent the Colorado Party in the 2018 Paraguayan General elections, raising criticism from the opposition that their senate candidacies were unconstitutional, but the Superior Tribunal of Electoral Justice overruled that decision, claiming that both Cartes and Duarte Frutos were eligible to run for the Senate, generating discussion in the political spectrum of 2018.

References 

9.Why was Paraguay's Congress burning?
10.Nicanor califica de lamentable el texto de enmienda y desafía Cartes
11.Nicanor se desentiende de Julio César Velázquez

External links

 Biography by CIDOB

1956 births
Living people
Presidents of Paraguay
Members of the Senate of Paraguay
Ambassadors of Paraguay to Argentina
Legislators with life tenure
Colorado Party (Paraguay) politicians
20th-century Paraguayan lawyers
Universidad Católica Nuestra Señora de la Asunción alumni
Universidad Nacional de Asunción alumni
Paraguayan Mennonites
People from Coronel Oviedo
Christians in Paraguay